Melaeninae is a subfamily of ground beetles in the family Carabidae. There are 2 genera and more than 20 described species in Melaeninae.

Genera
These two genera belong to the subfamily Melaeninae:
 Cymbionotum Baudi di Selve, 1864
 Melaenus Dejean, 1831

References

Carabidae subfamilies